Chaddsford Winery is a Pennsylvania winery located in the Brandywine Valley, in Pennsbury Township, Chester County, Pennsylvania, United States. It was founded in 1982, and is one of the largest wineries in the state, producing more than 30,000 cases annually.

In 2012, founder Eric Miller left the company and the winery sold off its vineyards. Though its focus shifted towards sweet wines at the same time, a small amount of dry wine is still produced.

The Chaddsford 2017 Cabernet Franc was selected as a finalist in the 2019 PA Sommelier Judgement Day awards.

References

External links

Patricia Talorico (August 15, 2017) "Chaddsford Winery marks a return to its roots with new, dry wines." The News Journal

Wineries in Pennsylvania
Buildings and structures in Chester County, Pennsylvania
1982 establishments in Pennsylvania